The San Xavier talus snail, scientific name Sonorella eremita, is a species of air-breathing land snail, a terrestrial pulmonate gastropod mollusc in the subfamily Helminthoglyptinae. This species is endemic to the United States.  The common name "talus snail" refers to the fact that snails in this genus live on and in talus.

References

U.S. Fish and Wildlife Service factsheet on Sonorella eremita detailing the common name in English. Retrieved on 26 June 2008.

Molluscs of the United States
Sonorella
Gastropods described in 1915
Taxonomy articles created by Polbot